Castle of Chaves is a medieval castle situated in the civil parish of Santa Maria Maior, in the municipality of Chaves, district of Vila Real.

Chaves
National monuments in Vila Real District
Buildings and structures in Chaves, Portugal
Chaves
It is classified as a National Monument.